is a Japanese footbaler who plays as a goalkeeper for  club Ventforet Kofu.

Career

Club
On 10 January 2017, Tsubasa signed for Nagoya Grampus.

In December 2022, it was announced that Shibuya would be joining J2 League club Ventforet Kofu for the 2023 season.

Career statistics

Club
.

References

External links
Profile at Nagoya Grampus

Profile at Yokohama FC

1995 births
Living people
Association football people from Tokyo
Japanese footballers
J1 League players
J2 League players
Yokohama FC players
Nagoya Grampus players
Ventforet Kofu players
Association football goalkeepers